Sancidino Malam da Silva (born 5 March 1994) is a Portuguese professional footballer who currently plays either as a forward or a winger.

Club career
Sancidino was born in Bissau, Guinea-Bissau. On 4 November 2012, he played his first professional match for Benfica B against Sporting B in Segunda Liga, coming as a substitute in the 88th minute. On 30 June 2014, his contract with Benfica ended and he left the club, but on 24 February 2015, he announced that he had returned to Benfica and had signed a five-year contract.

On 29 February 2020, FC Ararat Yerevan announced the signing of Silva.

On 5 August 2021, Silva joined Saudi Arabian club Al-Taraji.

International career
Sancidino represented the Portuguese under-17 team in the qualification for the 2010 UEFA European Championship, held in Liechtenstein. Later he was called for the final squad, playing in three games in an eventual group stage exit.

Club statistics

References

External links
 
 
 
 

1994 births
Living people
Sportspeople from Bissau
Portuguese footballers
Portugal youth international footballers
Bissau-Guinean footballers
Portuguese people of Bissau-Guinean descent
Association football forwards
Liga Portugal 2 players
Primeira Liga players
Armenian Premier League players
S.L. Benfica B players
F.C. Arouca players
Leixões S.C. players
Swiss Challenge League players
FC Lausanne-Sport players
FC Ararat Yerevan players
Al-Taraji Club players
Portuguese expatriate footballers
Portuguese expatriate sportspeople in Armenia
Portuguese expatriate sportspeople in Saudi Arabia
Portuguese expatriate sportspeople in Switzerland
Expatriate footballers in Armenia
Expatriate footballers in Saudi Arabia